Australian Islamic College is a multi-campus independent Islamic co-educational primary and secondary day school, located in Perth, Western Australia and Adelaide, South Australia.

History 
The school was established in 1986 by Abdallah Saad Magar as the Muslim Community School on Brisbane Street in Perth. In 1990 a second campus was opened in Thornlie to cater for students from grades K-10, and in 1996 a third campus was opened in the northern suburb of Dianella. In 2000 Kewdale was opened on the grounds of the former Kewdale Senior High School. On 22 June 2017, the Adelaide campus was opened on the site of the former Islamic College of South Australia in the Adelaide suburb of West Croydon.

Controversies
In 2007, Australian Islamic College was raided by 28 fraud squad officers and ten investigators from the Department of Education, Science and Training investigations unit. Abdallah Saad Magar and the Principal Aziz Magdi were charged with fraud offences against the governments of Australia and Western Australia. The charges related to falsifying records to indicate that more students were attending the school than actually were and thereby obtaining money for the school to which they were not entitled. The amount that was alleged to have been obtained fraudulently was A$3.16 million. Both were found guilty in the District Court on 31 March 2010. Abdallah Saad Magar appealed the conviction to the Supreme Court, however his application was denied.

In June 2010, Australian Islamic College posted an article in Wake Up Call, issue 172, written by a year 12 student defending the misappropriation of funds. The article  stated that "when a man does all this [fraud] for Islam in the western society, when he does it for the guidance of the Muslim childrenI cannot call that fraud".

See also

 Education in Australia
 List of schools in the Perth metropolitan area
 Islam in Australia

References

Further reading

External links 

Private primary schools in Perth, Western Australia
Private primary schools in Adelaide
Islamic schools in Australia
Educational institutions established in 1986
Private secondary schools in Perth, Western Australia
Private secondary schools in Adelaide
1986 establishments in Australia